The 1967 Grand National was the 121st renewal of the world-famous Grand National steeplechase that took place at Aintree Racecourse near Liverpool, England, on 8 April 1967. The race is best remembered for being won by outsider Foinavon at odds of 100/1, after being the only horse to avoid a mêlée at the 23rd fence and jump it at the first attempt.

By Becher's Brook on the second circuit 28 horses were left in the race and all jumped it successfully. One horse, Vulcano, had been injured in a fall at the third fence and was euthanised.

The most dramatic moment of the race, and perhaps of Grand National history, came when a loose horse – Popham Down, who had been hampered and unseated his rider at the first fence – veered dramatically to his right at the 23rd fence, slamming into Rutherfords, unseating its jockey Johnny Leech. A pile-up ensued. Rondetto, Norther, Kirtle Lad, Princeful, Leedsy and other horses hit the ground, then began running up and down the fence preventing others from jumping and bringing the whole race effectively to a halt. Some even began running in the wrong direction, back the way they had come.

Foinavon, whose owner had travelled to Worcester on race day to ride another of his horses, had been in 22nd position at Becher's, about three lengths behind the favourite Honey End, and his jockey, John Buckingham, had sufficient time to steer his mount wide of the mêlée and find a small gap in the fence to jump cleanly on the outside.

Being on the only horse over the 23rd at the first attempt, Buckingham found himself with a surprise lead of 30 lengths. Although 17 jockeys remounted to give chase and some did make up considerable ground, especially Josh Gifford on 15/2 favourite Honey End, none had time to catch Foinavon before he passed the finishing post 15 lengths clear. His success paid out a record 444/1 on the Tote.

After the race, commentator Michael O'Hehir suggested that with obstacles like Becher's Brook and Valentine's, the 23rd might one day be named after Foinavon. In 1984, the Aintree executive officially named the fence (the smallest on the course at ) the Foinavon fence.

As part of the BBC's coverage of the 2010 Grand National, jockey John Buckingham described some of the extraordinary circumstances of his win in an interview. Three jockeys had turned down Foinavon prior to the race (his price the day before the National was 500/1), but Buckingham took up the opportunity to ride in the famous steeplechase. With a clear view of the mêlée at the 23rd, Foinavon was almost hampered by Honey End, whose jockey had remounted, turned around and was ready to attempt to jump the fence. At the next obstacle, the Canal Turn, Buckingham looked back in disbelief at the clear lead he held with just six fences remaining. After passing the elbow on the run-in, he got a final burst of energy from Foinavon, and later reflected: "Then there was no doubt, I knew I won it. I was absolutely over the moon."

1967 was also the year when Red Rum made his first appearance at Aintree, as a two-year-old in a five-furlong sprint, finishing in a dead-heat for first the day before the National. Ten years later, he would return to the same racecourse to secure his unprecedented third Grand National title.

A similar incident to the mêlée at the 23rd fence occurred in the 2001 when Red Marauder won the race from Smarty after they were left clear following a pile-up at the Canal Turn on the first circuit, and after the other remaining horses fell or were brought down by the 20th fence.

It was also reminiscent of the 1928 Grand National, when Tipperary Tim was the only horse to finish the race without being remounted, also at odds of 100-1.

Finishing order

Non-finishers

Media coverage

Once again the BBC provided the television coverage with David Coleman fronting a special edition of Grandstand. Four commentators were used for the first time, Peter O'Sullevan, Bob Haynes, Michael O'Hehir and Michael Seth-Smith.

References 

 1967
Grand National
Grand National
20th century in Lancashire
April 1967 sports events in the United Kingdom